Karup may refer to:
 Karup, a town in Viborg Municipality, Denmark
 Karup Municipality, a former municipality in the former Viborg County, Denmark
 Midtjyllands Airport, formerly known as Karup Airport, in Viborg Municipality, Denmark